Keenan Vaz (born 12 September 1991) is an Indian first-class cricketer. He is part of Goa cricket team as wicket-keeper-batsman. He has also played U-19 South zone has been part of the National cricket academy.

References

External links
 
 Cricketarchive

1988 births
Living people
Indian cricketers
Goa cricketers
Cricketers from Goa
People from Margao
Wicket-keepers